Shackerstone railway station is a preserved railway station and heritage museum in Leicestershire, Central England.  It is the terminus and the headquarters of the heritage Battlefield Line Railway, with the Shackerstone Railwayana Museum, tea room, shop, loco shed and main rolling stock located here.

The Ashby Canal is nearby.

History

The original intention was to site the station where it is today, but in response to a request from Lord Howe of Gopsall Hall, the Committee agreed to move it north of the junction and call it "Gopsall"; but soon altered their minds and moved it back to the junction. Land for this purpose was bought from Lord Howe, who in 1877, was allowed to plant trees along the approach road to the station. The station was designed by the Midland Railway company architect John Holloway Sanders.

Its position made Shackerstone strategically important in the operation of the line, and it seems to have been selected as the headquarters of the inspector, Manning, in charge of the working of the line. Probably he combined the post with the stationmastership (as was done on the GN-LNWR Joint Line in East Leicestershire at Melton Mowbray) for no stationmaster is named at Shackerstone in the first staff list, and Manning’s pay, 50 shillings per week, was much higher than any other member of the ANJR’s staff. It must also have ranked in the top class of three varieties of station planned by the Committee, for constructional purposes, the estimated cost being £1,300 plus £350 for the stationmaster’s house. The building of Shackerstone Station was undertaken by Messrs. J. & E. Woods of Derby, as part of a contract that also included the stations of Measham, Snarestone, Heather and Hugglescote, for which the contract price was £12,826.15. On this basis the price of Shackerstone should have been about £3,500. One thing remains at present unknown: the name of the architect. As the stations on the ANJR are similar to a few on the Midland system, it is likely that they are the work of a member of the Midland Railway’s staff, as there is no reference in the minutes to payments to any outside architect in this connection.

The station became a grade II listed building in 1989.

The Sheds 
The loco shed is signposted from Platform 1 and is only a short walk from the Station through the original goods yard. Access to parts of the shed and workshops are restricted for reasons of safety. The shed is made up of various sections of local NCB buildings and even part of a Nuneaton cinema.

The shed plays host to many different locomotives and is sectioned into two key areas. The main and central area is the "running shed". This features easy access to both the workshop and stores and includes an inside locomotive inspection pit. The 2nd area, which features 2 roads at the south end of the shed, is used many for storage of long-term projects.

In Early 2023 the railway announced that a new engine shed was to be constructed. As of march 2023 they were in the fundraising stage.

References

External links
Battlefield Line Railway

Heritage railway stations in Leicestershire
Museums in Leicestershire
Railway museums in England
Railway stations in Great Britain opened in 1873
Railway stations in Great Britain closed in 1931
Former London and North Western Railway stations
Former Midland Railway stations
Grade II listed railway stations
Grade II listed buildings in Leicestershire
John Holloway Sanders railway stations
railway station